Rama is an Indian actress who has appeared in the Tamil film industry in 1990. 
After her marriage in 1991, she stopped acting in movies and settled with her husband Venkatesh and two sons. However she made a film comeback in the 2010 movie Aval Peyar Thamizharasi in mother roles and also acting with other supporting roles and TV serials.

Career
Shanthi was a volleyball player for the Tamil Nadu team when director Bharathiraja cast her in En Uyir Thozhan (1990). The director had continued his tradition of christening his heroines in new names beginning with "R", and "Rama" was subsequently the name given to her. Though it fared poorly at the box office, critics since have applauded the film in hindsight. She was cast in a movie “Anthi Varum Neram” along with her sister Latha as lead heroine role(1990) The failure of the film prompted her to stop appearing in Tamil films.

She made a brief return in 2010, playing a mother role in Aval Peyar Thamizharasi before earning critical acclaim as Karthi’s feisty, possessive mother in Pa. Ranjith’s Madras (2014). She has since also been a part of A. R. Murugadoss’ Kaththi (2014), where she played Vijay’s mother, and the political drama Purampokku Engira Podhuvudamai (2015). She also acted in television serials such as Bharathiraja's "Appanum Athaalum" which was telecast on Kalaignar TV and also in serials "Avalum Penn Thaane" and "Kanavarukaaga" which were telecast on Sun TV.

Personal life
Rama married Venkatesh in 1991. The couple have two sons.

Filmography

Web series

References

Living people
Actresses in Tamil cinema
Actresses from Tamil Nadu
People from Pudukkottai district
Indian film actresses
20th-century Indian actresses
21st-century Indian actresses
Year of birth missing (living people)